Pars FC Örebro was founded 2007 by Ata Pirmoradi and Sebastian Nyberg in Örebro and is currently playing in Swedish Football Division 4. In April 2016 Pat Walker took over the club and renamed it Scandinavian Football Club Örebro in order to make the team more professional and attract more players from around the world.

Season to season

Notable players
This list of notable players comprises players who have been professional soccer players before or after their time in Pars FC Örebro
  Taylor Bowlin
  Breno Kessler
  Daniel Taylor
  Eric Jangholm Melin

Futsal Season to season

* League restructuring in 2014 resulted in a new division being created at Tier 1 and subsequent divisions dropping a level.

References

 
*******************

Football clubs in Örebro County
Iranian football clubs in Sweden